Grass Roots: The Best of New Grass Revival is a compilation album by the progressive bluegrass band New Grass Revival, released in 2005.

Track listing

 Great Balls of Fire (Blackwell, Hammer) ) 2:07
 Prince of Peace (Dempsey, (Russell)) 5:27
 Casey Jones (Traditional) 4:21
 The Dancer (Brines, Bush) 3:42
 Doin' My Time (Skinner) 6:40
 All Night Train (Brines, Bush) 3:12
 Vamp in the Middle (Hartford) 3:44
 Spring Peepers (Lucas) 3:27
 Lee Highway Blues (Traditional) 5:49
 Souvenir Bottles (Brines, Bush), (Cowan) 5:49
 Sapporo (Bush) 8:11
 Steam Powered Aero Plane (Hartford) 4:30
 When the Storm Is Over  (Lucas) 2:37
 You Don't Knock  (Staples, Westbrook) 2:42
 White Freight Liner Blues [live] (VanZandt) 3:05
 Good Woman's Love [live] (Coban) 4:27
 Reach [live] (Hall) 4:54
 One More Love Song (Russell) 3:22
 On the Boulevard (Flynn) 4:13
 One Love/People Get Ready (Marley, Mayfield) 3:54
 Seven by Seven (Fleck) 3:17
 In the Middle of the Night (Flynn) 4:29
 Sweet Release (Flynn) 4:23
 Metric Lips (Fleck) 4:36
 Unconditional Love (Cook, Nicholson) 3:22
 Looking Past You (Flynn) 2:57
 Revival [live] (Rowan) 4:03
 Ain't That Peculiar [live] (Moore, Robinson Jr., Rogers) 3:02
 Callin' Baton Rouge (Linde)  2:41
 I'm Down (Lennon, McCartney) 2:12
 Angel Eyes (Hiatt, Koller) 4:29
 Don't You Hear Jerusalem Moan (Traditional) 3:57
 Do What You Gotta Do (Flynn) 3:33
 Singing the Blues (McCreary) 11:12
 Can't Stop Now (Nicholson, Waldman) 4:28

Personnel
Sam Bush – guitar, mandolin, fiddle, vocals
Pat Flynn – guitar, vocals
Curtis Burch – guitar, Dobro, vocals
Béla Fleck – banjo, vocals
Courtney Johnson – banjo, vocals
John Cowan – vocals, bass

Additional musicians:
Eddie Bayers – drums
Bob Mater – drums
Tom Roady – percussion

References

New Grass Revival albums
2005 compilation albums
Capitol Records compilation albums